Anabel Medina Garrigues and Arantxa Parra Santonja were the defending champions, but chose not to participate this year.

Nao Hibino and Alicja Rosolska won the title, defeating Dalila Jakupović and Nadiia Kichenok in the final, 6–2, 7–6(7–4).

Seeds

Draw

Draw

References
 Main Draw

Monterrey Open - Doubles
2017 Doubles